Vinícius Bergantin (born 31 July 1980) is a Brazilian professional football coach and former player who played as a central defender. He is the current head coach of CSA.

Career
Vinícius was born in Salto. He began his career at the academy of Ituano Futebol Clube in 1998 and signed a professional deal at the club in 2000 after impressing the coaching staff there. His first and only season at the club was very successful, as he impressed many with his ability to make forward runs and finished the season with three league goals in twenty-four appearances. This good form attracted the interest of other clubs, including Associação Desportiva São Caetano, who signed him in 2001.

However Vinícius rarely featured for São Caetano, making just two league appearances and scoring once. In 2002, he was signed by Sociedade Gama. Here he regularly made appearances for the club, taking part in nineteen games in the league without scoring. He was showing a lot of potential and European clubs began to show an interest. Gama agreed to loan Vinícius out to German Bundesliga outfit Hannover 96 for the 2002–03 season. He made seventeen appearances, scoring twice during this loan spell and impressed the manager at the time. Hannover signed Vinícius for £700,000 in 2003.
Vinícius had a spinal disc herniation and so he could not play from 2008–2010. Hannover 96 did not extend his contract because of his injury, but he is at the team to keep in shape.

Three months after being without a club since his departure from Hannover, he joined the Americana Futebol in January 2011. After his retirement, he started working as an assistant manager in his first club Ituano in 2017, being appointed manager later in the same year.

Bergantin resigned from Ituano on 6 June 2021, after nearly four years in charge of the club. He subsequently worked at Inter de Limeira and Santo André in his native state, before being named head coach of CSA on 21 February 2023.

References

External links

Living people
1980 births
People from Salto, São Paulo
Association football central defenders
Expatriate footballers in Germany
Brazilian footballers
Campeonato Brasileiro Série A players
Bundesliga players
Ituano FC players
Associação Desportiva São Caetano players
Sociedade Esportiva do Gama players
Hannover 96 players
Guaratinguetá Futebol players
Brazilian football managers
Campeonato Brasileiro Série C managers
Campeonato Brasileiro Série D managers
Ituano FC managers
Footballers from São Paulo (state)
Associação Atlética Internacional (Limeira) managers
Esporte Clube Santo André managers
Centro Sportivo Alagoano managers